The North River is an  river in northeastern Missouri, the United States.

Tributaries
Named tributaries of North River include Lazy Branch, Sidnor Creek (Palmyra Big Spring Branch), Lick Creek, Big Branch, Little North River, Hawkins Branch, Merrills Branch, Tiger Fork, Weldons Branch, Looney Creek, Clear Creek, Mesner Branch, Garnett Branch, and Owl Creek.

History of name
The river is believed to be a candidate for the "River Jeffreon" that was referenced in the 1804 Treaty of St. Louis presided over by William Henry Harrison with the Sac and Fox. Zebulon Pike identified this river as the Jeffreon in his August 19 journal entry with the spelling "Jauflione", although no distinction other than "The Jauflione is about 30 yards wide at its mouth, and bears from the Mississippi about S.W." serves to distinguish it from the nearby Fabius Rivers or South River. The island across the Mississippi River from the outlet of these tributary rivers is labeled "Jeffreon" on Pike's map. The River Jeffreon marked the northern border of Sac and Fox land ceded in Missouri (extending north from the mouth of the Gasconade River on the Missouri River and then down the river to the Mississippi.  In the same treaty the tribes ceded much of northern Illinois and southern Wisconsin on the east side of the Mississippi. Several legal cases stemming from the 1804 treaty have identified North River as the River Jeffreon.

It derived its current name from its position relative to Palmyra, Missouri. The North River flows north of that town and the South River flows south of it, with the outlets into the Mississippi being shared at times in the past and still within  of each other. On some maps from the early 19th century, these rivers are labeled as "North Two Rivers" and "South Two Rivers".

References

External links
 National Water Information System: Web Interface, USGS 05501000 North River at Palmyra, MO

Rivers of Missouri
Quincy–Hannibal area
Rivers of Knox County, Missouri
Rivers of Shelby County, Missouri
Rivers of Marion County, Missouri